Mitchel Tate Musso (born July 9, 1991) is an American actor and singer. He is best known for his three Disney Channel roles as Oliver Oken in Hannah Montana; Jeremy Johnson in the animated series Phineas and Ferb; and his Disney XD role as King Brady on Pair of Kings. He was the host of Disney Channel's PrankStars.

He voiced DJ in the computer animated/motion capture film, Monster House, and starred as Raymond Figg in the Disney Channel Original Movie, Life Is Ruff, released in 2005. Musso's self-titled debut album was released on June 2, 2009, on Walt Disney Records. The album debuted at number 19 on the Billboard 200.

Early life 
Musso was born in Garland, Texas, the son of Katherine (née Moore) and Samuel Musso, who were involved in community theater in Dallas, Texas.  He has two brothers – Mason Musso, who sang lead vocals in the band Metro Station, and Marc Musso, an actor. He is of Italian and English descent. He grew up in Rockwall, Texas.

Career

Acting 

In 2003, Mitchel made his Hollywood film debut in Secondhand Lions, alongside his brother Marc. Before Musso was cast in Secondhand Lions, he had been in several films beforehand: Am I Cursed? as Richie and The Keyman as a Cub Scout, both in 2002. Musso also starred in three episodes of King of the Hill as the voice of Bobby Hill's friend Curt in the episodes "The Powder Puff Boys" and "Bobby Rae" as well as the surfer kid in "Four Wave Intersection" in 2007.

In addition to his role as Oliver Oken in Disney Channel's Hannah Montana, Musso also voiced Jeremy Johnson in Phineas and Ferb, a boy on whom the title characters' sister, Candace (Ashley Tisdale) has a crush. Other acting credits include Raymond Figg in the Disney Channel Original Movie, Life Is Ruff, the voice of Aang in the unaired version of the pilot episode of Avatar: The Last Airbender, the voice of DJ in the film Monster House, and Hannah Montana: The Movie, which was released on April 10, 2009.

He appeared in the Disney Channel Games in 2006 on the Green Team, and appeared on the Red Team in 2007 and 2008. He also appeared in the TV movie Walker, Texas Ranger: Trial by Fire alongside Chuck Norris and Selena Gomez. On June 2, 2008, Musso was a surprise guest at the Spotlight Awards at the North Shore Music Theatre in Beverly, Massachusetts. He presented awards to the Best Actor and Best Actress of the 2007–2008 theatrical year. In 2008 Musso, Miley Cyrus and Billy Ray Cyrus all made "family" guest appearances in Metro Station's music video for "Seventeen Forever".

In early 2009, Musso was cast, alongside The Suite Life on Deck and House of Payne's Doc Shaw, in a new television series for Disney XD titled Pair of Kings. The series began production in March 2010, following the production of the final season of Hannah Montana in which Musso will only be a guest. The series premiered on September 10, 2010. It was announced that Musso would be the host of Disney Channel's latest hidden camera reality series, PrankStars, which premiered on July 15, 2011.

On December 12, 2011, Disney XD renewed the series Pair of Kings for a third season. Musso did not return for the new season and, instead, he was replaced by a new character played by Adam Hicks.

Music 

Musso sang a remixed remake of the song "Lean on Me" for the Disney film, Snow Buddies; the music video is included on the DVD and the song is included on the Radio Disney Jams, Vol. 10 CD. Musso also sang the song "If I Didn't Have You" with Hannah Montana co-star Emily Osment for the Disneymania 6 CD in 2008 and sang the song Stand Out for the Disneymania 7 CD in 2010. For their 2009 Disney Channel Original Movie, Hatching Pete, Musso teamed up with co-star Tiffany Thornton, from Sonny with a Chance, to record a song called "Let It Go" that was used in the film. The two also worked on a music video for the song which was released to Disney Channel. Musso also recorded a song called "The Girl Can't Help It" for another Disney Channel Original Movie, Princess Protection Program. "Let it Go" and "The Girl Can't Help It" was featured on the Disney compilation album, Disney Channel Playlist, which was released on June 23, 2008. And sang "Live like Kings" on Disney XD's Pair of Kings on Disney Channel. Also in 2009, Musso collaborated on the School House Rock song "The 3 R's"; an educational song about recycling.

In a studio effort, Musso released his self-titled debut album on June 2, 2009. His debut single, "The In Crowd", a cover of a John Hampson song, premiered on Radio Disney on December 5, 2008. The song is also featured on Radio Disney Jams, Vol. 11. His second single, "Hey", was released on May 15, 2009, on Radio Disney with an accompanying music video that premiered on Disney Channel. He was the host of the Disney Channel series Prank Stars and sang the theme song.

In July and August 2009, Musso opened for Metro Station. He also launched a headlining tour in August, with KSM, as his opening act.  The tour concluded September 24 in New Orleans, Louisiana. On Saturday, September 4, 2010, he put on a free concert at the Great New York State Fair's Chevy Court.  One week later he put on another free show at the Utah State Fair. Musso's second release, Brainstorm, was released on November 23, 2010. He made a video for each one of his songs on the album to "Tell the whole story." His song "Celebrate" was in the radio Disney Top 3.

On 23 September, 2022, after a ten-year hiatus, Musso returned to the music industry, releasing a new single, titled, "DRANK", for his upcoming mixtape, Ghost. The mixtape is scheduled for release on October 28, 2022.

Legal issues 
On October 17, 2011, at 3:43 a.m., Musso was pulled over in Burbank, California, failed to slow down for traffic cops, and charged with a DUI suspicion. He was approached by the police who then smelled alcohol and proceeded to give him a field sobriety test and breathalyzer. Musso, aged 20, was under the legal drinking age and blew above the legal limit of .08 blood alcohol content. His bail was set at $5,000, but he was released on account of no outstanding warrants. Musso told E! Online, that, "In becoming an adult, I have learned first hand that stepping up and taking responsibility is the best way to move forward. I am especially thankful to my family and fans for their unwavering support and encouragement. I am glad to now put this in the past." This incident is what caused his character to be written out of Pair of Kings and the show PrankStars to be cancelled.

Other activities
In 2018, Musso appeared at Turning Point USA's Young Women's Leadership Summit with Sarah Palin and Candace Owens.

Filmography

Film

Television

Video games

Discography 

 Studio albums

 Mitchel Musso (2009)

 GHOST (2022)

 Extended plays

 Brainstorm (2010)

Awards and nominations

References

External links 

 Musso's Official page on Facebook
 
 

1991 births
Living people
21st-century American male actors
Male actors from Texas
American male child actors
American child singers
American male pop singers
American people of Italian descent
American people of Albanian descent
American people of English descent
American male television actors
American male voice actors
American male video game actors
Child pop musicians
Musicians from Dallas
Male actors from Los Angeles
People from Garland, Texas
People from Rockwall, Texas
People from Los Angeles
Walt Disney Records artists
21st-century American singers
21st-century American male singers